Idaho Maximum Security Institution (IMSI) is a maximum-security prison located near Kuna, Idaho, one of a cluster of seven detention facilities known as the "South Boise Prison Complex". The other prisons in the area are the Correctional Alternative Placement Program, the Idaho State Correctional Center, the Idaho State Correctional Institution, the South Boise Women's Correctional Center, the South Idaho Correctional Institution, and the South Idaho Correctional Institution-Community Work Center. IMSI houses Idaho's death row for men and execution chamber.

The IMSI prison was opened in November 1989 to confine Idaho's most violent offenders.

The compound is located within a double perimeter fence reinforced with razor wire, an electronic detection system and a 24-hour armed perimeter patrol. The offender population includes many mental health offenders, including subjects of civil commitments. Thirty beds are dedicated for prisoners with acute mental illness. IMSI has restrictive housing beds dedicated to administrative segregation, disciplinary detention and death row. The remaining beds are allocated for close-custody general population offenders.

Notable prisoners
 Curtis Allgier
 Thomas Eugene Creech
 Paul Ezra Rhoades (executed in 2011)
 Keith Wells (executed in 1994)
 James Edward Wood (died in 2004)

References

Prisons in Idaho
Buildings and structures in Ada County, Idaho
Capital punishment in Idaho
Execution sites in the United States
1989 establishments in Idaho